Dame Margaret Anne Brimble  (née MacMillan, born 20 August 1961) is a New Zealand chemist. Her research has included investigations of shellfish toxins and means to treat brain injuries.

Early life, family, and education
Brimble was born in Auckland on 20 August 1961, the daughter of Mary Anne MacMillan (née Williamson) and Herbert MacMillan, and was encouraged by her grandmother to value education. She attended Diocesan School for Girls, Auckland from 1972 to 1978, and was dux in her final year.

She went on to study chemistry at the University of Auckland from 1979 to 1983, graduating Bachelor of Science in 1982 and Master of Science with first-class honours in 1983. She was awarded a New Zealand Commonwealth scholarship to undertake a PhD in organic chemistry at the University of Southampton.

Career and research
Brimble holds the Chair of Organic and Medicinal Chemistry at the University of Auckland and is also a Principal Investigator in the Maurice Wilkins Centre for Molecular Biodiscovery.

Awards and honours
She is a Fellow of the Royal Society of New Zealand and the Royal Society of Chemistry.

Brimble was the first New Zealander to receive the L'Oreal-UNESCO Award for Women in Science, and the second woman to receive the Rutherford medal.

Brimble was made a Member of the New Zealand Order of Merit for services to science in the 2004 New Year Honours. In the 2012 New Year Honours, she was promoted to Companion of the New Zealand Order of Merit, also for services to science. She was elected a Fellow of the Royal Society (FRS) in 2018. In the 2019 New Year Honours, she was promoted to Dame Companion of the New Zealand Order of Merit, for services to science.

In 2014, Brimble received the Science and Innovation Award at the New Zealand Women of Influence Awards.

In 2017, Brimble was selected as one of the Royal Society Te Apārangi's "150 women in 150 words", celebrating the contributions of women to knowledge in New Zealand.

Personal life
In 1981, she married Mark Timothy Brimble.

References

1961 births
Living people
Scientists from Auckland
New Zealand chemists
Fellows of the Royal Society of New Zealand
Dames Companion of the New Zealand Order of Merit
New Zealand women chemists
University of Auckland alumni
Alumni of the University of Southampton
Academic staff of the University of Auckland
People educated at Diocesan School for Girls, Auckland
L'Oréal-UNESCO Awards for Women in Science laureates
21st-century British women scientists
New Zealand Women of Influence Award recipients
Fellows of the Royal Society of Chemistry
Recipients of the Rutherford Medal
20th-century British women scientists
20th-century chemists
21st-century chemists
20th-century New Zealand scientists
21st-century New Zealand scientists
New Zealand women scientists
Fellows of the Royal Society
Female Fellows of the Royal Society